Giovanni Sulcis (born 17 June 1975) is a retired Italian football midfielder.

References

1975 births
Living people
Italian footballers
Cagliari Calcio players
S.E.F. Torres 1903 players
U.S.D. Atletico Catania players
A.C. ChievoVerona players
A.C. Perugia Calcio players
Association football midfielders
Serie A players
Serie B players
People from Bosa
Footballers from Sardinia